Côteaux is an arrondissement in the Sud department of Haiti. As of 2015, the population was 58,618 inhabitants. Postal codes in the Côteaux Arrondissement start with the number 84.

The arondissement consists of the following municipalities:
 Côteaux
 Port-à-Piment
 Roche-à-Bateaux

References

Arrondissements of Haiti
Sud (department)